Archibald Smith (1813–1872) was a Scottish mathematician and lawyer.

Archibald Smith may also refer to:

Archibald Bisset Smith (1878–1917), Scottish recipient of the Victoria Cross
Archibald D. Smith (1832–1904), member of the Wisconsin State Assembly
Archibald Levin Smith (1836–1901), British judge and rower
Archibald Cary Smith (1837–1911), naval architect and marine engineer

See also
Archibald Smith Plantation Home, a historic house in Roswell, Georgia

Archie Smith (disambiguation)